Dietrich Fischer-Dieskau (28 May 1925 – 18 May 2012) was a German lyric baritone and conductor of classical music, one of the most famous Lieder (art song) performers of the post-war period, best known as a singer of Franz Schubert's Lieder, particularly "Winterreise" of which his recordings with accompanists Gerald Moore and Jörg Demus are still critically acclaimed half a century after their release.

Recording an array of repertoire (spanning centuries) as musicologist Alan Blyth asserted, "No singer in our time, or probably any other has managed the range and versatility of repertory achieved by Dietrich Fischer-Dieskau. Opera, Lieder and oratorio in German, Italian or English came alike to him, yet he brought to each a precision and individuality that bespoke his perceptive insights into the idiom at hand." In addition, he recorded in French, Russian, Hebrew, Latin and Hungarian. He was described as "one of the supreme vocal artists of the 20th century" and "the most influential singer of the 20th Century".

Fischer-Dieskau was ranked the second greatest singer of the century (after Jussi Björling) by Classic CD (United Kingdom) "Top Singers of the Century" Critics' Poll (June 1999). The French dubbed him "Le miracle Fischer-Dieskau" and Dame Elisabeth Schwarzkopf called him "a born god who has it all." At his peak, he was greatly admired for his interpretive insights and exceptional control of his soft, beautiful instrument. He dominated both the opera and concert platforms for over thirty years.

Early years
Albert Dietrich Fischer was born in 1925 in Berlin to Albert Fischer, a school principal, and Theodora (née Klingelhoffer) Fischer, a teacher. In 1934, his father added the hyphenated "Dieskau" to the family name (through his mother, he was descended from the Kammerherr von Dieskau, for whom Johann Sebastian Bach wrote the "Peasant Cantata"). He started singing as a child and began formal voice lessons at the age of 16. When he was drafted into the Wehrmacht during World War II in 1943, tending horses on the Russian Front, Fischer-Dieskau had just completed his secondary school studies and one semester at the Berlin Conservatory. He served in Grenadier Regiment 146 of the 65th Infantry Division south of Bologna in the winter of 1944–45 and entertained his comrades at soldiers' evenings behind the lines.

He was captured in Italy in 1945 and spent two years as an American prisoner of war. During that time, he sang Lieder in POW camps to homesick German soldiers. He had a physically and intellectually impaired brother, Martin, who was sent to an institution by the Nazi regime and starved to death. His family home was also destroyed during the war.

Singing career
In 1947, Fischer-Dieskau returned to Germany, where he launched his professional career as a singer in Badenweiler, singing in Brahms's Ein Deutsches Requiem without any rehearsal. (He was a last-minute substitute for an indisposed singer.) He gave his first Lieder recital in Leipzig in the autumn of 1947 and followed it soon afterwards with a highly successful first concert at Berlin's Titania-Palast.

From early in his career he collaborated with famous lyric sopranos Elisabeth Schwarzkopf and Irmgard Seefried, and the recording producer Walter Legge, issuing instantly successful albums of Lieder by Schubert and Hugo Wolf.

In the autumn of 1948, Fischer-Dieskau was engaged as principal lyric baritone at the Städtische Oper Berlin (Municipal Opera, West Berlin), making his debut as Posa in Verdi's Don Carlos under Ferenc Fricsay. This company, known after 1961 as the Deutsche Oper, would remain his artistic home until his retirement from the operatic stage, in 1978.

Subsequently, Fischer-Dieskau made guest appearances at the opera houses in Vienna and Munich. After 1949 he made concert tours in the Netherlands, Switzerland, France and Italy. In 1951, he made his Salzburg Festival concert debut with Mahler's Lieder eines fahrenden Gesellen (Songs of a Wayfarer) under Wilhelm Furtwängler. That year, he also made his British debut, at the Royal Albert Hall in London during the Festival of Britain. He appeared in Frederick Delius's A Mass of Life, conducted by Sir Thomas Beecham. He made regular opera appearances at the Bayreuth Festival between 1954 and 1961 and at the Salzburg Festival from 1956 until the early 1970s.

As an opera singer, Fischer-Dieskau performed mainly in Berlin and at the Bavarian State Opera in Munich. He also made guest appearances at the Vienna State Opera, at the Royal Opera House, Covent Garden in London, at the Hamburg State Opera, in Japan, and at the King's Theatre in Edinburgh, during the Edinburgh Festival. His first tour in the United States took place in 1955, when he was 29, with his concert debut in Cincinnati on 15 April (J. S. Bach's cantata Ich will den Kreuzstab gerne tragen ) (BWV 56) and 16 April (Ein Deutsches Requiem). His American Lieder debut, singing Franz Schubert songs, took place in Saint Paul, Minnesota, on 19 April. His New York City debut occurred on 2 May at The Town Hall, where he sang Schubert's song cycle Winterreise without an interval. Both American recitals were accompanied by Gerald Moore.

In 1951, Fischer-Dieskau made his first of many recordings of Lieder with Gerald Moore at the EMI Abbey Road Studios, London, including a complete Die schöne Müllerin, and they performed the work on 31 January 1952 at the Kingsway Hall, London in the Mysore Concerts of the Philharmonia Concert Society. They gave recitals together until Moore retired from public performance in 1967. They continued, however, to record together until 1972, in which year they completed their massive project of recording all of the Schubert lieder appropriate for the male voice. Gerald Moore retired completely in 1972, and died in 1987, aged 87. Their recordings of Die schöne Müllerin and Winterreise are highly prized as examples of their artistic partnership.

Fischer-Dieskau also performed many works of contemporary music, including Benjamin Britten (who chose Fischer-Dieskau as the baritone soloist when writing War Requiem), Samuel Barber, Hans Werner Henze, Karl Amadeus Hartmann (who wrote his Gesangsszene for him), Ernst Krenek, Witold Lutosławski, Siegfried Matthus, Othmar Schoeck, Winfried Zillig, Gottfried von Einem and Aribert Reimann. He participated in the 1975 premiere and 1993 recording of Gottfried von Einem's cantata An die Nachgeborenen, written in 1973 as a commission of the UN, both with Julia Hamari and the Wiener Symphoniker conducted by Carlo Maria Giulini.

Beyond his recordings of Lieder and the German opera repertoire, Fischer-Dieskau also recorded performances in the Italian operatic field. His recordings of Verdi's Rigoletto (alongside Renata Scotto and Carlo Bergonzi) and Rodrigo in Verdi's Don Carlos, are probably the most respected of these ventures. (Others, such as the title role in Verdi's Macbeth (with Elena Souliotis), Giorgio Germont in Verdi's La traviata, and Scarpia in Giacomo Puccini's Tosca (with Birgit Nilsson), are not delivered by him with the same degree of effectiveness.) As conductor Ferenc Fricsay put it, "I never dreamed I'd find an Italian baritone in Berlin."

Retirement
Fischer-Dieskau retired from opera in 1978, the year he recorded his final opera, Aribert Reimann's Lear, which the composer had written at his suggestion. He retired from the concert hall as of New Year's Day, 1993, at 67, and dedicated himself to conducting, teaching (especially the interpretation of Lieder), painting and writing books. He still performed as a reciter, reading for example the letters of Strauss to Hugo von Hofmannsthal (whose part was read by Gert Westphal), for the Rheingau Musik Festival in 1994; and both performing and recording Strauss's melodrama Enoch Arden. He also became an honorary member of the Robert Schumann Society.

Recognition
Throughout his career, his musicianship and technique were frequently described as flawless by critics. As Greg Sandow of Opera News put it, "Overall, his technique is breath-taking; someone should build a monument to it."

As 'the world's greatest Lieder singer' (Time magazine), he regularly sold out concert halls all over the world until his retirement at the end of 1992. The precisely articulated accuracy of his performances, in which text and music were presented as equal partners, established standards that endure today. The current widespread interest in German Romantic art song is mainly due to his efforts. Perhaps most admired as a singer of Schubert Lieder, Fischer-Dieskau had, according to critic Joachim Kaiser, only one really serious competitor – himself, as over the decades he set new standards, explored new territories and expressed unanticipated feelings and emotions.

Few artists achieve the level of recognition, admiration and influence of Fischer-Dieskau, and even fewer live to see that influence realised during their own lifetime. Ushering in the modern recording era, he challenged our perception and processes of how recordings could be made, explored the possibilities of modern recording and exploited the potential for the popularity of classical music – and all this while setting standards of artistic achievement, integrity, risk-taking, and of the aesthetic ideal that became our new norm. Whenever we bask in the beauty of his tone, revere the probing, questioning power of his intellect, or simply wonder at the astonishing physical abilities throughout all that he has achieved in his long recording career, we must also pause and say THANK YOU to this great artist, whose legacy, like a great and bright star lighting the way for those who follow in his passion for singing, is exemplary in every way.—Thomas Hampson, May 2012, Hall of Fame, Gramophone Magazine.

Awards
 Léonie Sonning Music Prize 1975
 Ernst von Siemens Music Prize 1980
 Praemium Imperiale 2002
 Polar Music Prize 2005
 Gramophone Hall of Fame entrant 2012
 Chevalier de la Légion d'honneur 1990.
 Won five Grammy Awards: in 1970, 1972, 1977, 1988, and 2000.

Personal life
In 1949, Fischer-Dieskau married the cellist Irmgard Poppen. Together they had three sons: Mathias (a stage designer), Martin (a conductor), and Manuel (a cellist with the Cherubini Quartet). Irmgard died in 1963 of complications following childbirth. Afterwards, Fischer-Dieskau was married to the actress Ruth Leuwerik, from 1965 to 1967, and Kristina Pugell, from 1968 to 1975. In 1977 he married the soprano Júlia Várady.

His older brother Klaus Fischer-Dieskau was a notable Berlin choral director who conducted for Fischer-Dieskau several times, including in his only recording of a passion by Heinrich Schütz in 1961.

Fischer-Dieskau smoked during a large part of his career. In an interview with B.Z.-News aus Berlin in 2002 he said, "I quit smoking 20 years ago. I smoked for 35 years, and then stopped in a single day."

Death
On 18 May 2012, Fischer-Dieskau died in his sleep at his home in Berg, Upper Bavaria, 10 days before his 87th birthday.

Partial discography

As singer
Fischer-Dieskau recorded mainly for the EMI, Deutsche Grammophon and Orfeo labels

 Bach, 75 Cantatas, with Karl Richter on the Polygram label
 Bach, Jesus and bass parts in the Passions under a wide host of conductors, e.g. Herbert von Karajan, Otto Klemperer, Wilhelm Furtwängler, Fritz Lehmann, and Karl Richter
 Bach, Christmas Oratorio, with Sir Philip Ledger
 Bartók, Bluebeard's Castle, with Ferenc Fricsay
 Bartók, Bluebeard's Castle, with his fourth wife Julia Varady as Judith, directed by Wolfgang Sawallisch
 Beethoven, Fidelio, with Fricsay
 Beethoven, Fidelio, with Leonard Bernstein
 Beethoven, Choral Symphony, with Fricsay
 Alban Berg, Vier Lieder (Four Songs), Op. 2, with Aribert Reimann, piano, on the Deutsche Grammophon label
 Alban Berg, Wozzeck, with Karl Böhm
 Alban Berg, Lulu, with Karl Böhm
 Brahms, Ein Deutsches Requiem, with Rudolf Kempe
 Brahms, Ein deutsches Requiem, with Otto Klemperer and the Philharmonia Orchestra on the Angel label
 Brahms, Ein deutsches Requiem, with Otto Klemperer, the Philharmonia Orchestra and Elisabeth Schwarzkopf on the EMI label 1961 recorded at Kingsway Hall in March 1961
 Brahms, Liebeslieder Walzer on the Deutsche Grammophon label
 Brahms, Vier ernste Gesänge, lieder, with Jörg Demus, piano on the Deutsche Grammophon label
 Brahms, Die schöne Magelone
 Britten, War Requiem, Benjamin Britten conducting, with Galina Vishnevskaya and Sir Peter Pears
 Busoni, Doktor Faust, conductor Ferdinand Leitner
 Cimarosa, The Secret Marriage, with Daniel Barenboim
 Debussy, Mélodies, with Hartmut Höll, piano, recorded 1988 for Claves Records, available in 2006 on Brilliant Classics
 Fauré, Requiem, Op. 48 under André Cluytens on EMI
 Gluck, Orfeo ed Euridice with Karl Richter
 Gluck, Orfeo ed Euridice with Fricsay
 Gluck, Iphigenie in Aulis with Artur Rother
 Gluck, Iphigenie in Aulis with Kurt Eichhorn and Anna Moffo
 Gluck, Iphigénie en Tauride with Gardelli
 Haydn, The Creation, singing the role of Adam, with Herbert von Karajan
 Haydn, The Creation, singing the roles of Adam and the Archangel Raphael, with Sir Neville Marriner
 Henze, Elegie für junge Liebende, with Martha Mödl, the composer conducting
 Paul Hindemith, Cardillac, with Joseph Keilberth
 Paul Hindemith, Mathis der Maler, with Rafael Kubelík
 Paul Hindemith, When lilacs last in the dooryard bloom'd (Requiem "for those we love"), with Wolfgang Sawallisch
 Franz Liszt, 44 Lieder, with Daniel Barenboim on the Deutsche Grammophon label
 Carl Loewe, Carl Loewe Ballads and Lieder, with pianist Jörg Demus
 Carl Loewe Loewe: Balladen & Lieder, with pianist Hartmut Höll
 Mahler, Das Lied von der Erde, with Leonard Bernstein and the Vienna Philharmonic
 Mahler, Lieder, with Daniel Barenboim, piano, on the EMI label
 Mahler, Lieder eines fahrenden Gesellen and Des Knaben Wunderhorn, with Daniel Barenboim, Berliner Philharmoniker, on the Sony label
 Mahler, Lieder eines fahrenden Gesellen and Kindertotenlieder with orchestra, with Wilhelm Furtwängler and Rudolf Kempe, on the EMI label
 Mahler, Kindertotenlieder, with Karl Böhm
 Mahler, Rückert-Lieder, on the Deutsche Grammophon label
 Felix Mendelssohn, Lieder, with Hartmut Höll, piano, recorded 1989 and 1991 for Claves Records, available in 2006 on Brilliant Classics
 Mendelssohn, Paulus Oratorio, with the Düsseldorfer Symphoniker conducted by Rafael Frühbeck de Burgos, recorded 1976-1977, published by Sony ATV Publishing
 Mozart and Haydn Discoveries, with Reinhard Peters and the Vienna Haydn Orchestra on the Decca label

 Mozart, The Magic Flute with Ferenc Fricsay
 Mozart, The Magic Flute, with Karl Böhm
 Mozart, The Magic Flute, with Georg Solti (as the Sprecher)
 Mozart, The Marriage of Figaro, with Karl Böhm
 Mozart, The Marriage of Figaro, with Ferenc Fricsay
 Mozart, Don Giovanni, with Ferenc Fricsay (in German)
 Mozart, Don Giovanni, with Karl Böhm
 Mozart, Così fan tutte, at least two different recordings are available, one starring Gundula Janowitz as Fiordiligi; the other starring Irmgard Seefried, both conducted by Karl Böhm. DFD plays Don Alphonso in both.
 Mozart, Requiem, with Daniel Barenboim
 Mozart, Coronation Mass and Vesperae Solennes De Confessore with Eugen Jochum
 Offenbach, Les contes d'Hoffmann, as Lindorf/Coppelius/Miracle/Dapertutto on the EMI label
 Orff, Carmina Burana, with Eugen Jochum and the Chor und Orchester der Deutschen Oper Berlin on the Deutsche Grammophon label
 Hans Pfitzner, Lieder, with Hartmut Höll, piano
 Hans Pfitzner, Palestrina as Carlo Borromeo, on DGG with Rafael Kubelik 
 Puccini, Tosca, with Birgit Nilsson, as well as excerpts in German with Anja Silja, on Decca Records
 Puccini, Gianni Schicchi  Westdeutscher Rundfunk
 Reger, Hebbel Requiem with the Philharmoniker Hamburg and Gerd Albrecht
 Reimann, Lear, with the Bavarian State Orchestra on the Polygram label
 Gioacchino Rossini, Gugliemo Tell with M. Rossi
 Schoeck, Lebendig begraben, with Radio-Symphonie-Orchester Berlin, on the Deutsche Grammophon label
 Schoeck, Notturno, five movements für voice and string quartet, on EMI Classics
 Schoeck, Lieder, with Margrit Weber (piano) and Karl Engel (piano), on the Deutsche Grammophon label
 Schubert, Deutsche Messe, with Wolfgang Sawallisch and the Orchester des Bayerischen Rundfunks on the Capitol label
 Schoenberg, selected songs from Opp. 2, 3, 6, 12, 14, and 48, with Aribert Reimann, piano, on the Deutsche Grammophon label
 Schubert, Winterreise, with Gerald Moore, piano, on the Deutsche Grammophon label
Schubert, Winterreise, with Daniel Barenboim, piano, on the Deutsche Grammophon label
 Schubert, Winterreise, with Jörg Demus, piano, on the Deutsche Grammophon label
 Schubert, Die schöne Müllerin, with Gerald Moore, piano, on the Angel label
 Schubert, Lieder, with Gerald Moore, piano on the Deutsche Grammophon label
 Schubert, Lieder, with Sviatoslav Richter, piano on the Deutsche Grammophon label
 Schubert, Missa Solemnis and Masses in C major and E flat major, with Wolfgang Sawallisch and the Bavarian Radio Symphony Orchestra on the EMI label
 Schubert, Schwanengesang, with Gerald Moore, piano on the EMI label
 Schubert, Schwanengesang, a recital from 1948 with Klaus Billing, piano on the Myto label
 Schubert, Lieder, with Hartmut Höll, piano, recorded 1987 for Claves Records, available in 2006 on Brilliant Classics
 Schumann, Dichterliebe, both Liederkreise, and the complete lieder for male voice, with Christoph Eschenbach, piano, on the Deutsche Grammophon label
 Schumann, both Liederkreise, with Gerald Moore, piano, on the EMI label
 Schütz St Matthew Passion SWV 479 Berlin Hugo-Distler Chor, dir. Klaus Fischer-Dieskau Archiv LP 1961
 Shostakovich, Suite on Verses of Michelangelo Buonarroti and Four Verses of Captain Lebyadkin, with Vladimir Ashkenazy and the Radio Symphony Orchestra Berlin on the Polygram label
 Shostakovich, Symphony No. 14 with Bernard Haitink, Júlia Várady and the Concertgebouw Orchestra on the Decca label
 Johann Strauss, The Gypsy Baron, with Willi Boskovsky
 Johann Strauss, Die Fledermaus, with Willi Boskovsky
 Richard Strauss, Elektra, with Karl Böhm
 Strauss, Lieder, with Gerald Moore
 Strauss, Arabella, with Wolfgang Sawallisch
 Strauss, Die Frau ohne Schatten, with Joseph Keilberth (Deutsche Grammophon; re-released on Brilliant Classics)
 Strauss, Salome, with Karl Böhm
 Strauss, Der Rosenkavalier, with Karl Böhm
 Strauss, Ariadne auf Naxos, with Kurt Masur
 Strauss, Capriccio, with Wolfgang Sawallisch
 Verdi, Un ballo in maschera (in German), with Fritz Busch
 Verdi, La traviata, with Lorin Maazel
 Verdi, Otello with Sir John Barbirolli
 Verdi, Falstaff, with Leonard Bernstein
 Verdi, Macbeth, with Elena Souliotis
 Verdi, Aida, with Daniel Barenboim
 Verdi, Rigoletto with Renata Scotto, Carlo Bergonzi, Rafael Kubelík and the La Scala Orchestra on the Deutsche Grammophon label
 Verdi, Don Carlos, in German, with Ferenc Fricsay, 1948 (DFD's operatic debut)
 Verdi, Don Carlos, in Italian, with Georg Solti
 Wagner, Die Meistersinger von Nürnberg, as Hans Sachs, with Eugen Jochum and the Berliner Staatsopernorchester on the Deutsche Grammophon label
 Wagner, Die Meistersinger von Nürnberg, as Fritz Kothner the baker, with Andre Clutyens, at Bayreuth, 1956
 Wagner, Lohengrin with Rudolf Kempe (EMI), as Friedrich von Telramund
 Wagner, Lohengrin, with Eugen Jochum (conductor), Bayreuth Festival Orchestra, 1954, as the Heerrufer
 Wagner, Lohengrin, with Georg Solti, Vienna Philharmonic Orchestra, as the Heerrufer (Decca)
 Wagner, Der fliegende Holländer, with Franz Konwitschny (EMI)
 Wagner, Das Rheingold, with Herbert von Karajan (DG)
 Wagner, Götterdämmerung, with Georg Solti and the Vienna Philharmonic Orchestra on the Decca label, as Gunther
 Wagner, Tristan und Isolde, with Wilhelm Furtwängler
 Wagner, Tristan und Isolde, with Carlos Kleiber
 Wagner, Tannhäuser with Otto Gerdes on DG
 Wagner, Tannhäuser with Wolfgang Sawallisch
 Wagner, Tannhäuser with Franz Konwitschny
 Wagner, Parsifal, with Hans Knappertsbusch (live at Bayreuth, 1956, CD manufactured by Arkadia)
 Wagner, Parsifal, in studio with Georg Solti
 Weber, Lieder, with Hartmut Höll, piano, recorded 1991 for Claves Records, available in 2006 on Brilliant Classics
 Webern, selected early songs, with Aribert Reimann, piano, on the Deutsche Grammophon label
 Wolf, Frühe Lieder, with Hartmut Höll, piano, recorded 1986 for Claves Records, available in 2006 on Brilliant Classics
 Zemlinsky, Lyric Symphony, with Lorin Maazel

As reciter
Strauss, Enoch Arden, with Burkhard Kehring, piano

As conductor
Berlioz, Harold in Italy with violist Josef Suk and the Czech Philharmonic Orchestra on the Supraphon label
Brahms, Symphony No. 4, with the Czech Philharmonic Orchestra on the Supraphon label
Mahler, Das Lied von der Erde with the Radio-Sinfonieorchester Stuttgart on the Orfeo label
Schubert, Symphonies No. 5 and 8 "Unfinished," with the New Philharmonia Orchestra on the EMI label
Richard Strauss, Arias from Salome, Ariadne auf Naxos, Die Liebe der Danae, and Capriccio, with Júlia Várady and the Bamberg Symphony Orchestra on the Orfeo label
Richard Wagner, Wesendonck Lieder with Júlia Várady, Deutschland-Sinfonie-Orchester, Orfeo

On video
Schubert, Winterreise, recorded July 1990, with Murray Perahia (piano), from Sony Classical.
Schubert, Winterreise, recorded January 1979, with Alfred Brendel (piano), Sender Freies Berlin (SFB), from TDK 2005.
Mozart, Don Giovanni, Deutsche Oper Berlin, with Ferenc Fricsay, live performance in German, recorded 24 September 1961. Cast includes Pilar Lorengar, Elisabeth Grümmer, Walter Berry, Erika Köth, Donald Grobe, and Josef Greindl.
Strauss (Richard), Mahler, and Schubert: "Schwarzkopf, Seefried, and Fischer-Dieskau", a DVD from EMI Classics. Includes Schwarzkopf playing the Marschallin and Fischer-Dieskau singing "Erlkönig".
Mozart, Le nozze di Figaro Vienna Philharmonic Orchestra conducted by Lorin Maazel, from the Salzburg Festival, 1963. A DVD from VAI.
Mozart, Die Zauberflöte (1971) Hamburg Philharmonic State Orchestra and Chorus of Hamburg State Opera, conducted by Horst Stein, directed by Sir Peter Ustinov. Fischer-Dieskau as the Speaker, with Hans Sotin as Sarastro, Nicolai Gedda as Tamino, Cristina Deutekom as Queen of the Night, Edith Mathis as Pamina, William Workman as Papageno. A DVD from Arthaus Musik GmbH, Leipzig.
Verdi, Don Carlos, a live performance in German, with Pilar Lorengar, James King, Josef Greindl, and Martti Talvela, conducted by Wolfgang Sawallisch, from the Deutsche Oper, 1965.

Books
Texte deutscher Lieder. Deutscher Taschenbuchverlag, Munich, 1968.
Auf den Spuren der Schubert-Lieder. Werden – Wesen – Wirkung. F.A. Brockhaus, Wiesbaden, 1971. Translated by Kenneth S Whitton as Schubert's Songs: A Biographical Study. Alfred A. Knopf, 1977.
Wagner und Nietzsche: der Mystagoge und sein Abtrünniger. Deutsche Verlags-Anstalt, Stuttgart, 1974. translated by Joachim Neugroschel as Wagner and Nietzsche. Continuum International, 1976.
The Fischer-Dieskau Book of Lieder: The Original Texts of over 750 Songs, translated by Richard Stokes and George Bird. Random House, 1977.
Robert Schumann. Wort und Musik. Das Vokalwerk. Deutsche Verlags-Anstalt, Stuttgart, 1981. translated by Reinhard G. Pauly as Robert Schumann Words and Music: The Vocal Compositions. Hal Leonard, 1992.
Töne sprechen, Worte klingen: Zur Geschichte und Interpretation des Gesangs. Deutsche Verlags-Anstalt, Stuttgart/Munich, 1985.
Nachklang. Deutsche Verlags-Anstalt, Stuttgart, 1988. translated by Ruth Hein as Echoes of a Lifetime, Macmillan, London, 1989, and as Reverberations: The Memoirs of Dietrich Fischer-Dieskau. Fromm International, New York, 1989.
Wenn Musik der Liebe Nahrung ist: Kunstlerschicksale im 19. Jahrhundert. Deutsche Verlags-Anstalt, Stuttgart, 1990.
Weil nicht alle Blütenträume reifen: Johann Friedrich Reichardt: Hofkapellmeister dreier Preussenkönig. Deutsche Verlags-Anstalt, Stuttgart, 1993.
Fern die Klage des Fauns. Claude Debussy und seine Welt. Deutsche Verlags-Anstalt, Stuttgart, 1993.
[Paintings and drawings 1962–1994, a selection]. Nicolaische Verlagsbuchhandlung Beuermann, Berlin, 1994.
Schubert und seine Lieder. Deutsche Verlags-Anstalt, Stuttgart, 1996.
Carl Friedrich Zelter und das Berliner Musikleben seiner Zeit. Nicolai Verlag Berlin, 1997.
Die Welt des Gesangs. J.B. Metzler Verlag, Stuttgart, 1999.
Zeit eines Lebens – auf Fährtensuche. Deutsche Verlags-Anstalt, Stuttgart, 2000.
Hugo Wolf. Leben und Werk. Henschel Verlag, Kassel, 2003.
Musik im Gespräch: Streifzüge durch die Klassik mit Eleonore Büning. List Taschenbuch Verlag, Berlin, 2005.
Goethe als Intendant: Theaterleidenschaften im klassischen Weimar. Deutscher Taschenbuch Verlag, Stuttgart, 2006.
Johannes Brahms: Leben und Lieder. List Taschenbuch Verlag, Berlin, 2008.
Jupiter und ich: Begegnungen mit Furtwängler. Berlin University Press, 2009.

Notes

Further reading
Neunzig, Hans A. Dietrich Fischer-Dieskau  Trans. Kenneth S Whitton. Gerald Duckworth & Co, 1998.
Whitton, Kenneth S. Dietrich Fischer-Dieskau: Mastersinger Holmes & Meier Publishers, 1981.

External links

Biography at Mwolf.com 
2000 Interview with Steve Holtje for CDNOW.com 
On video singing Bach (YouTube)
Singing Gluck, with Maria Stader (YouTube, audio only)
Schubert's "Winterreise", on video (YouTube)

1925 births
2012 deaths
Musicians from Berlin
People from Steglitz-Zehlendorf
Singers awarded knighthoods
German operatic baritones
20th-century German male opera singers
German male conductors (music)
German prisoners of war in World War II held by the United States
Lieder singers
Grammy Award winners
Knights Commander of the Order of Merit of the Federal Republic of Germany
Recipients of the Pour le Mérite (civil class)
Royal Philharmonic Society Gold Medallists
Honorary Members of the Royal Academy of Music
Honorary Members of the Royal Philharmonic Society
Members of the Academy of Arts, Berlin
Benjamin Britten
Deutsche Grammophon artists
Recipients of the Praemium Imperiale
Recipients of the Léonie Sonning Music Prize
Ernst von Siemens Music Prize winners
20th-century German conductors (music)